Persoonia striata is a species of flowering plant in the family Proteaceae and is endemic to the south-west of Western Australia.

Description
Flowering occurs from November to December.

Taxonomy
Persoonia striata was first formally described in 1830 by Robert Brown in the Supplementum to his Prodromus Florae Novae Hollandiae et Insulae Van Diemen from specimens collected in 1829 near "King George's Sound" by William Baxter.

Distribution and habitat
This geebung grows in heath in the area between Lake Hope, Dumbleyung and Albany in the Avon Wheatbelt, Coolgardie, Esperance Plains, Jarrah Forest and Mallee biogeographic regions in the south-west of Western Australia.

References

striata
Flora of Western Australia
Plants described in 1830
Taxa named by Robert Brown (botanist, born 1773)